Sylvie Lucas (born 30 June 1965) was Luxembourg's ambassador to the United States of America from 2016 to 2019, having previously served as Permanent Representative to the United Nations from August 2008 to August 2016 and president of the United Nations Economic and Social Council (ECOSOC) (2009–2010) and the Security Council (2014).

Education
In 1988 Sylvie Lucas received a Master's degree in history from the Université des Sciences Humaines (University of Social Sciences) (now the University of Strasbourg) and, in 1989, a master's degree in political science and administration from the College of Europe in Bruges, Belgium.

Diplomatic career
From 1990 to 1995 she worked at the Luxembourg Ministry of Foreign Affairs, first for a year in the Department of Political and Cultural Affairs, and then in the Department of International Relations and Economic Affairs.  From 1995 to 2000 she was the deputy permanent representative of Luxembourg to the United Nations. She then returned to the Department of Political Affairs as deputy director from 2000 to 2003.

In 2003, Sylvie Lucas became Luxembourg's ambassador to Portugal and Cape Verde, In 2004 she again returned to the Department of Political Affairs, this time as director. On 25 August 2008, ambassador Lucas became the United Nations' permanent representative from Luxembourg. In September 2008 she was elected vice-president of ECOSOC to fill the unexpired term of ambassador Jean-Marc Hoscheit who had left the UN. On 15 January 2009 she was elected to a one-year term as president of ECOSOC.

On November 21st, 2016, Lucas presented her credentials as Ambassador to Canada.

Notes

Sources
 "Curriculum vitae of H.E. Ms Sylvie Lucas", Luxembourg's United Nations office
 "Sylvie Lucas" Kobiety w polityce (Women in Politics), in Polish

External links
  Luxembourg Ministry of Foreign Affairs
 

Luxembourgian diplomats
University of Strasbourg alumni
College of Europe alumni
1965 births
Permanent Representatives of Luxembourg to the United Nations
Living people
Ambassadors of Luxembourg to Portugal
Ambassadors of Luxembourg to Cape Verde
Ambassadors of Luxembourg to the United States
Luxembourgian women diplomats
United Nations Economic and Social Council
Ambassadors of Luxembourg to Canada
Luxembourgian women ambassadors